Thawed Carp is a 2017 Russian drama film directed by Vladimir Kott.

Plot 
The film tells the story of a retired teacher in a provincial village, Yelena Nikiforova, who is suddenly given a terminal diagnosis by her doctor. Not wishing to disturb her son who works as a personal advancement trainer in the city, she sets about organising her own funeral. The carp of the title refers to a carp she is given which she freezes, but which on thawing out turns out to be still alive.

Cast 
 Marina Neyolova as Elena Mikhaylovna
 Alisa Freindlikh as Lyudmila
 Yevgeny Mironov as Oleg
 Anton Shpinkov as Pashka
 Tatyana Tuzova as Sveta
 Olga Kozhevnikova as Natasha
 Natalya Surkova as Dormeneyeva
 Tatyana Rasskazova as Faina Pavlovna
 Sergei Puskepalis as Anisimov
 Aleksandr Bashirov as Undertaker

References

External links 
 

2017 films
2010s Russian-language films
Russian drama films
2017 drama films
Films about old age